1-(2-Phenylethyl)pyrrolidine (PEP) is a chemical compound. It is an analogue of 2-phenylethylamine where the amine has been replaced by a pyrrolidine ring.

It is the base chemical structure for a series of stimulant drugs, including:

 α-PBP
 α-PPP
 α-PVP
 MDPBP
 MDPPP
 MDPV
 MOPPP
 MPBP
 MPHP
 MPPP
 Naphyrone
 Prolintane
 Pyrovalerone

All of these compounds differ from PEP in that the alpha carbon is extended and a ketone is attached to the beta carbon (with the exception of prolintane), among other modifications.

It is unknown whether PEP itself has any stimulant properties, but it can be considered likely.

See also 
 Phenethylamine
 Amphetamine
 Cathinone

Pyrrolidines
Stimulants